Nationalist Party (in Spanish: Partido Nacionalista) was a political party in Peru.  It was founded in 1930 by Elías Lozada Benavente.

Political parties established in 1930
Defunct political parties in Peru